Hay Creek is a stream in Sauk County, Wisconsin, in the United States.

Hay Creek was named from the fact early settlers produced hay there.

See also
List of rivers of Wisconsin

References

Rivers of Sauk County, Wisconsin
Rivers of Wisconsin